Steins;Gate 0 is a visual novel video game developed by 5pb. It is part of the Science Adventure series, and is set in the period of the 2009 game Steins;Gate. It was released by 5pb. in Japan for the PlayStation 3, PlayStation 4 and PlayStation Vita in 2015, Microsoft Windows in 2016, Xbox One in 2017, and Nintendo Switch in 2019. It was also released by PQube in North America and Europe for the PlayStation 4 and PlayStation Vita in 2016, and by Spike Chunsoft internationally for Microsoft Windows in 2018 and Nintendo Switch in 2019. A manga adaptation premiered in 2017, and an anime adaptation of the game premiered in 2018.

The story is seen from several characters' viewpoints, mainly the protagonist of the original game, Okabe Rintaro, one of the heroines of the original game, Amane Suzuha, and the neuroscientist Hiyajo Maho. After meeting Maho and her co-worker Alexis Leskinen, Okabe becomes a tester for the artificial intelligence (AI) system Amadeus. The player reads the text and dialogue that comprise the story, and affects the direction of the plot by choosing whether to answer phone calls from the Amadeus; early in the game, the story splits into two main branches, which in turn branch into the game's different endings.

The game was planned by Chiyomaru Shikura, using Steins;Gate audio dramas and light novels as a base for one of the routes; it is not a direct adaptation of them, however, and features a new scenario. The music was composed by Takeshi Abo, who made notes of his first impressions of the emotional flow while reading the story, using these to create music with a good relation to the game's worldview. The English localization was a large project, taking place over the course of five months; it was done with the intention to avoid Westernizing the game too much due to the importance the Japanese setting and culture hold in the game, while still striving to keep it accessible for Western players. The game was well received by critics, who enjoyed the story, visuals and audio; it was however criticized for being padded with extraneous scenes, and the new choice system received criticism for both excessive complexity and simplicity.

Gameplay

Steins;Gate 0 is a visual novel, where the player reads through the story in the form of passages of text and dialogue, accompanied by character sprites and background art. The story consists of multiple branches, which lead to different endings. As opposed to the original Steins;Gate single route that runs from start to finish with multiple branch points throughout, Steins;Gate 0 features one branch point near the beginning of the game, where the story splits into two major story branches, which in turn branch again into the different endings; there are in total two main story paths, along with four side stories. The direction of the story is determined based on whether or not the player chooses to answer calls from the artificial intelligence Amadeus, which the player character Okabe Rintaro can communicate with through his cell phone. In addition to Okabe, the player also takes the roles of other characters, mostly Amane Suzuha and Hiyajo Maho.

The player can also use Okabe's phone to interact with his friends through the messaging app RINE: at some points, the game shows a notification indicating that Okabe has received a message, and the player can choose between different messages to send back – either text messages or stickers – temporarily locking the game into a conversation with the other character that changes depending on the player's reply. Unlike the Amadeus calls, the RINE messages do not affect the branching of the story.

Synopsis

Setting and characters

Steins;Gate 0 takes place in an alternative future before Steins;Gate ending, and is set in Akihabara, Tokyo. It follows several characters, including the university student Okabe "Okarin" Rintaro, who, together with his friends Shiina "Mayushii" Mayuri, the neuroscientist Makise Kurisu and the hacker Hashida "Daru" Itaru, accidentally have discovered time travel through the use of a microwave oven and a phone – the PhoneWave – which they used to send text messages and digitized memory data back in time. The latter, referred to as "time leaping", essentially transports a person's mind to their body at an earlier point. This has drawn the attention of SERN, an organization that secretly researches time travel, who sent their team of "Rounders" to confiscate the time machine, including the journalist Kiryu Moeka, killing Mayuri in the process.

Within the game world, time consists of alternative histories ("world lines") that branch and re-merge, meaning that events at converging points are destined to happen unless events in the past are changed enough for them to lead to a history so significantly different that it belongs to another cluster of world lines (an "attractor field") with different converging points. One such converging point is Mayuri's death in 2010; to prevent it, Okabe went back in time and caused the shift from the alpha attractor field to beta, where Kurisu was killed and time travel was not discovered. Between the alpha and beta attractor fields lies the "Steins Gate" world line, which is unaffected by their convergence points. Some people can retain memories from the previous world line after a shift, an ability Okabe possesses and calls "Reading Steiner".

Among other characters are Daru's future daughter, the time traveler Amane Suzuha; Mayuri's future adoptive daughter Shiina Kagari; Kurisu's co-workers Hiyajo Maho, Alexis Leskinen and Judy Reyes from Viktor Chondria University; Okabe's friends Urushibara Luka and Akiha "Faris NyanNyan" Rumiho; and Mayuri's friends Amane Yuki, Nakase "Fubuki" Katsumi and Kurushima Kaede.

Plot
The game begins during Steins;Gate ending, where Suzuha traveled to August 21, 2010 using her time machine to get Okabe to prevent a time-travel arms race leading to World War III; to do this, he needs to stop Kurisu's father, Doctor Nakabachi, from killing Kurisu and bringing her time travel theories to Russia. Suzuha brings Okabe to the moment of the murder, July 28, 2010, but he accidentally kills Kurisu himself due to world-line convergence. Upon returning to the present, Okabe refuses Suzuha's requests to try again, and develops post-traumatic stress disorder. Nearly five months later, Okabe attends Kurisu's coworkers Maho and Leskinen's presentation of their Amadeus system, which uses digitized memories as artificial intelligence avatars; one avatar has been made based on Kurisu. Speaking with them, Okabe becomes a tester for Amadeus, allowing him to communicate with Amadeus Kurisu through his phone. While trying to change Okabe's mind, Suzuha looks for Kagari, who got separated when traveling to 1998. Maho, who has Kurisu's hard drive, wants to access her theories, hoping to be able to save Kurisu; Russia, other countries, and groups including SERN are also after the theories, and the world line shifts as they monitor activities surrounding Kurisu's theories and memories. The story splits into two major branches: In the one leading to the ending "Promised Rinascimento", Okabe rebuilds the PhoneWave to help an amnesiac woman identified as Kagari, who has had Kurisu's memories implanted by someone, which gradually overwrites her personality; this inadvertently transports him to 2036 during World War III. Although Okabe had been predetermined to die sometime in 2025, Daru circumvented it by implanting 2011 memory data, as Okabe's body was still alive. Inspired by this and determined to avert this future, Okabe returns to 2010, destroys the hard drive, erases Amadeus, and sends a D-RINE message to the past of this branch, telling himself to "deceive the world and tie the possibilities". The resulting world line is not shown.

The first major branch has two side branches: In "Recursive Mother Goose", Okabe and Mayuri trace the origin of Kagari's only memory, a song they learn Okabe originally sung as a child after Mayuri's grandmother's death. After nearly being hit by a truck, Kagari regains memories, including having escaped a facility she was held at in 2005. Mayuri intends to time travel with Suzuha to reach Steins Gate, but Kagari takes Mayuri's place as she fears not meeting her in Steins Gate. In "Twin Automata", Maho hides in Faris's apartment after a kidnapping attempt, and befriends Moeka. Noticing that somebody is trying to steal Amadeus, Leskinen and Maho go to lock down the data, but they are ambushed by Reyes, who shoots Leskinen and tries to make Maho give her the Amadeus access codes. Maho decides to erase Amadeus rather than give it up, and she is saved when Moeka shoots Reyes. While Amadeus Kurisu is being deleted, a Kurisu apparently from another worldline takes her perspective. She calls for help, and tells Maho that Steins Gate is real, and tells Maho her laptop password is related to Piano Sonata No. 10, a piece by Mozart that had been the theme for this ending branch. Returning home, Maho figures out Kurisu's password from this hint and finds her research. In the second major branch, leading to "Vega and Altair", Okabe stops testing Amadeus. If the "Promised Rinascimento" ending was completed first, a D-RINE message will appear early into the branch with its cryptic message: "deceive the world and tie the possibilities", but its origin is unknown. He and Maho are followed by groups who want Kurisu's theories, and Kurisu's hard drive is destroyed in a skirmish. Daru and Maho secretly rebuild the PhoneWave in an effort to save Kurisu, but is unable to complete the test due to missing components; Okabe tells them that saving Kurisu means sacrificing Mayuri, which Mayuri overhears. She decides to travel back in time with Suzuha to convince Okabe in 2010 to save Kurisu after failing in his prior attempt. However, Leskinen appears, revealing that he works for the intelligence agency Strategic Focus and intends to steal the time machine. Mayuri and Suzuha attempt to flee in the time machine, but it is hit by a rocket and destroyed. In the aftermath, Okabe discloses the missing components to Daru and Maho to complete the PhoneWave, thus allowing him to time leap to an earlier part of the day, and works to ensure Mayuri and Suzuha's successful time travel. Surrounded by Leskinen's men, he declares that he will find a way to Steins Gate.

The second major branch has the side branch "Gehenna's Stigma", where Maho is caught eavesdropping on Reyes and Leskinen, hearing that Leskinen thinks Okabe hides information. Leskinen uses Maho: She meets Okabe, who tells her about time travel provided that she does not try to save Kurisu. After he reveals where Suzuha's time machine is, Maho suffocates him; when waking up, he is tortured for information by Leskinen. Wracked with guilt for betraying Okabe, Maho makes an unsuccessful attempt to save Kurisu in her own way. World War III begins, Daru flees Akihabara to develop the time machine, and Okabe gives up on reaching Steins Gate. The final ending, "Milky-way Crossing", only appears after completing the "Promised Rinascimento" and "Vega and Altair" endings. It is set in 2025 on a world line similar to, but not the same as, the one from "Vega and Altair". Okabe sends a D-Mail video to his 2010 counterpart, instructing himself how to save Kurisu and cause the world line divergence into Steins Gate, thus setting the events that would play out as the True End route in the previous game. He then leaves in the time machine to find Suzuha and Mayuri, and bring them safely back to 2025.

Development
Steins;Gate 0 was developed by 5pb., and was planned by Chiyomaru Shikura and produced by Tatsuya Matsubara, and features character designs by Huke. The scenario was worked on by Naotaka Hayashi, Toru Yasumoto, Masaki Takimoto, and Tsukasa Tsuchiya, and makes use of the Epigraph Trilogy series of light novels and Steins;Gate audio dramas as a base for Vega and Altair route, which is the main route. It is however not a direct adaptation: it also features new scenarios, and the developers describe it as a "legitimate numbered sequel".

The music was composed by Takeshi Abo. His process for composing the music consisted of him reading the game's story, to get an as full as possible understanding of the setting and the character personalities. He considered his first impressions of the game's emotional flow and events to be very important: he would write them down together with the kind of music he would want to use for each scene, and keep them in mind when composing the music. He said that this approach, while taking longer than if he had just designated songs to various places in the game, made for higher quality music with a better relation to the game's worldview.

The game was announced in March 2015. It was originally scheduled to be released in Japan on November 19, 2015, but was delayed and released on December 10, 2015 for the PlayStation 3, PlayStation 4 and PlayStation Vita. Japanese first-print copies of the PlayStation 4 version included a digital PlayStation 4 copy of the first Steins;Gate. The PlayStation 4 and PlayStation Vita versions of Steins;Gate 0 were released by PQube in Europe on November 25, 2016 and in North America on November 29. They were made available in an "Amadeus Edition" that includes a soundtrack disc, an artbook, a pin badge, and a plush toy, and in a limited edition that includes just the game and the artbook. A Microsoft Windows version was released by 5pb. in Japan on August 26, 2016 after being delayed from its planned release date of June 24, and was published internationally by Spike Chunsoft on May 8, 2018 in both English and Japanese. An Xbox One version was released digitally in Japan on February 22, 2017. The game was also released for the Nintendo Switch as part of the collection Steins;Gate: Divergencies Assort along with Steins;Gate: My Darling's Embrace and Steins;Gate: Linear Bounded Phenogram on March 20, 2019 in Japan; internationally, the Nintendo Switch version was released by Spike Chunsoft on December 10, 2019 as a stand-alone game.

Localization
The English localization was led by Adam Lensenmayer, who was the sole translator for the project; this was to ensure consistency in the feeling of the story and in the characters' voices. The localization was done over the course of five months, something Lensenmayer noted as a big project. It was also a challenging one: its use of real-world science meant that the localization team had to research subjects like artificial intelligence, cognitive science and time travel theories to ensure that everything was phrased correctly. Another challenge was that Steins;Gate 0 was written specifically for a Japanese audience, who might understand certain things that Western players would not, although Lensenmayer said that this was a smaller problem than it had been with the first Steins;Gate, due to Steins;Gate 0 more serious tone and lesser focus on otaku and internet culture, and its built-in dictionary which explains obscure concepts.

Lensenmayer wrote the localized text with a general audience in mind, intending for it to be accessible regardless of the player's knowledge of the game's setting, while working towards creating something that people who have played the first Steins;Gate would enjoy. The localization team wanted to avoid overt Westernization of the game, because of the importance the Japanese setting and culture held in the story, and strived to achieve a level of Westernization similar to the first Steins;Gate localization. Lensenmayer said that some parts were difficult to localize, tempting the team to replace them with other, similar content, but that they tried to avoid this whenever they could. Aspects of Japanese culture that were deemed too obscure to Western players were handled the same way as in Steins;Gate: for example, the Japanese term senpai was left intact, with short explanatory dialogue added. One thing that took up a lot of time was localizing the character Mayuri's dialogue due to her way of speaking: Lensenmayer described her as acting "spacey", but not "stupid or ditzy", and said that there is a nuance of caring and awareness to her speech that does not come across in a direct translation. She was seen as a very important character, so conveying her personality accurately was given high priority.

Reception

Steins;Gate 0 was well received by critics, and was the best-reviewed PlayStation Vita game of 2016 on Metacritic. Kotaku considered it among the best Japan-only video games of 2015; it was the runner-up for RPGFan Best Adventure/Visual Novel of 2016 award, behind Firewatch, with the publication saying that it rivals the first Steins;Gate; and in 2020, Nintendo Life called it one of the best visual novels available on the Nintendo Switch. Critics called it a worthy follow-up to Steins;Gate, but thought that players should experience the original game or its anime adaptation beforehand.

Critics generally liked the story. Famitsu reviewers particularly liked its atmosphere, and Dennis Carden of Destructoid thought the way it continues the story of Steins;Gate makes it nearly "mandatory" for people who liked the original Steins;Gate. RPGFan Rob Rogan liked the overall story, calling it "exciting, somber, heart-wrenching, and thought-provoking", but said that it felt "artificially lengthened" through scenes that do not serve a clear purpose in the plot; Robert Fenner, also writing for RPGFan, agreed, saying that Okabe's dilemma of wanting to speak to the Amadeus Kurisu but finding it painful is a good premise, but that the game would have been better had it been a fifth as long. Jordan Helm at Hardcore Gamer similarly noted that Okabe's conversations with Amadeus Kurisu were among the highlights of the game, but that character-focused scenes often felt like "padding". Carden enjoyed how the game, despite its generally darker tone than Steins;Gate, still included moments of levity, saying that it made him "laugh just as much as it made [him] want to cry".

Carden thought most new characters were good additions and felt fully realized, but that some seemingly only existed for the sake of the plot. Rogan said that Okabe's character development since the original game made him a more interesting character, and Fenner thought that Okabe's characterization was the high point of the game, calling his self-hatred and impostor syndrome a believable depiction of high-functioning depression. Both Carden and Rogan enjoyed the use of multiple viewpoints in the story, saying that they give characters more depth and believability, and give the player a greater understanding of them.

Critics were mixed in their opinions on the gameplay, some considering it too complex and some too simple. Carden criticized the difficulty in reaching the different endings without following a guide, and how it sometimes is unclear what the effects of some player choices will be; Fenner did however find it fun and compelling to use knowledge from one playthrough to go back and make different choices while aiming for another ending. Rogan disliked how the player choice system was simpler than the one in Steins;Gate, calling it a step back for the series, and Helm thought that the player choices lacked the tension and regret of the original game's. Fenner appreciated how the RINE system improved upon the text messages from the previous game, allowing the player to see what exact message they would send prior to sending it while simultaneously automatically saving the game. Carden, Rogan and Helm appreciated the Tips system, considering it a helpful way to make sure that players understand concepts and terms discussed in the game.

The art direction, presentation and audio was well received, with Carden calling the visuals "utterly impressive", Rogan describing the character art as "sharp and charming" despite its limited amount of frames per character, and Helm saying that the series' aesthetic breathes life into the scenes. Rogan praised the background art, saying that the large amount of detail adds personality to the scenes without being distracting, and the music, which he said is perfectly matched to each scene's tone. Helm liked how the game uses several contextual sprites for characters rather than just a few static ones, and praised the attention to detail in Okabe's sprites, with their visual signs of mental fatigue.

Sales
The game sold 100,000 combined physical and digital copies on its first day of release in Japan, bringing total sales for the Steins;Gate games above one million copies sold. By the end of its debut week, 85,547 physical copies had been sold; the PlayStation Vita, PlayStation 4 and PlayStation 3 versions were the sixth, seventh and nineteenth best selling games of the week in Japan with 38,746, 38,156 and 8,645 copies sold, respectively. The PlayStation 4 version re-entered the Japanese sales charts again on the week of the Steins;Gate 0 anime adaptation's premiere, selling an additional 4,087 copies and bringing physical Japanese sales of the PlayStation 4 version to 60,990 copies sold. According to Shikura, the Xbox One version was not expected to sell very many copies.

The PlayStation Vita version was the best selling game for the platform in the United Kingdom during its European debut week, and still appeared on Chart-Track's weekly PlayStation Vita top-twenty charts until June 2017; the PlayStation 4 version did not chart at all in the United Kingdom during its debut, however. The Steam release had an estimated total of 16,300 players by July 2018.

Related media
As part of the "Steins;Gate World Line 2017–2018 Project", several pieces of media based on Steins;Gate 0 were produced, including a manga adaptation by Taka Himeno, which was serialized by Kadokawa Shoten in Young Ace from August 4, 2017 to February 4, 2020, and is collected in tankōbon volumes since April 4, 2018, the manga will be localized into English by UDON Entertainment and the first of three volumes will be released on September 7, 2021; an anime adaptation of the game by White Fox that premiered on April 11, 2018; and a novelization of the game by Tatsuya Hamazaki, Steins;Gate 0: Solitude of the Mournful Flow, which was published by Kadokawa Sneaker Bunko on August 1, 2018. A conversation partner application based on Amadeus Kurisu was revealed to be in development in September 2019. Steins;Gate 0 Elite, an updated version of the game which adds full animation, like Steins;Gate Elite did with Steins;Gate, was announced at the Science Adventure Live event in January 2020. It was announced to be scheduled for release before Anonymous;Code, which at the time was planned for Q3/Q4 2021 but which has since been delayed until 2022.

Steins;Gate 0-themed merchandise has also been released, including shoes, business card cases, watches, T-shirts, hoodies, and laptop bags. The Steins;Gate 0 Sound Tracks album was released in 2016 by 5pb. and Media Factory.

Notes

References

External links

2015 video games
2017 manga
Nintendo Switch games
Novels set during World War III
PlayStation 3 games
PlayStation 4 games
PlayStation Vita games
Post-traumatic stress disorder in fiction
PQube games
Science Adventure
Science fiction anime and manga
Science fiction video games
Seinen manga
Transhumanism in video games
Video game sequels
Video games about time travel
Video games based on novels
Video games developed in Japan
Video games featuring female protagonists
Video games scored by Takeshi Abo
Video games set in Tokyo
Video games with alternate endings
Windows games
World War III video games
Xbox One games